Yevgeni Markov may refer to:

 Yevgeni Ivanovich Markov (1769–1828), Russian military commander
 Yevgeni Markov (footballer, born 1994), Russian footballer
 Yevgeni Viktorovich Markov (born 1978), Russian footballer
 Evgeny Markov (politician) (born 1973), Russian politician
 Evgeny Markov (writer) (1835–1903), Russian writer
 Evgeny Markov (strongman), Russian strongman